Äkäsjärvi is a lake of Finland located in the province of Lapland.

See also
List of lakes in Finland

References

Lakes of Muonio